In celestial mechanics, the Lagrange points (also Lagrangian points or libration points) are points of equilibrium for small-mass objects under the influence of two massive orbiting bodies. Mathematically, this involves the solution of the restricted three-body problem.

Normally, the two massive bodies exert an unbalanced gravitational force at a point, altering the orbit of whatever is at that point. At the Lagrange points, the gravitational forces of the two large bodies and the centrifugal force balance each other. This can make Lagrange points an excellent location for satellites, as few orbit corrections are needed to maintain the desired orbit. 

For any combination of two orbital bodies there are five Lagrange points, L1 to L5, all in the orbital plane of the two large bodies. There are five Lagrange points for the Sun–Earth system, and five different Lagrange points for the Earth–Moon system. L1, L2, and L3 are on the line through the centers of the two large bodies, while L4 and L5 each act as the third vertex of an equilateral triangle formed with the centers of the two large bodies.

When the mass ratio of the two bodies is large enough, the L4 and L5 points are stable points meaning that objects can orbit them, and that they have a tendency to pull objects into them. Several planets have trojan asteroids near their L4 and L5 points with respect to the Sun; Jupiter has more than one million of these trojans. 

The Lagrange points have been proposed for uses in space exploration. Artificial satellites, for example the James Webb Space Telescope, have been placed at L1 and L2 with respect to the Sun and Earth, and with respect to the Earth and the Moon.

History
The three collinear Lagrange points (L1, L2, L3) were discovered by Leonhard Euler around 1750, a decade before Joseph-Louis Lagrange discovered the remaining two.

In 1772, Lagrange published an "Essay on the three-body problem". In the first chapter he considered the general three-body problem. From that, in the second chapter, he demonstrated two special constant-pattern solutions, the collinear and the equilateral, for any three masses, with circular orbits.

Lagrange points

The five Lagrange points are labelled and defined as follows:

point
The  point lies on the line defined between the two large masses M1 and M2. It is the point where the gravitational attraction of M2 and that of M1 combine to produce an equilibrium. An object that orbits the Sun more closely than Earth would typically have a shorter orbital period than Earth, but that ignores the effect of Earth's gravitational pull. If the object is directly between Earth and the Sun, then Earth's gravity counteracts some of the Sun's pull on the object, increasing the object's orbital period. The closer to Earth the object is, the greater this effect is. At the  point, the object's orbital period becomes exactly equal to Earth's orbital period.  is about 1.5 million kilometers from Earth in the direction of Sun, or 0.01 au.

point
The  point lies on the line through the two large masses beyond the smaller of the two. On the opposite side of Earth from the Sun, the orbital period of an object would normally be greater than Earth's. The extra pull of Earth's gravity decreases the object's orbital period, and at the  point, that orbital period becomes equal to Earth's. Like L1, L2 is about 1.5 million kilometers or 0.01 au from Earth (away from the sun). An example of a spacecraft at L2 is the James Webb Space Telescope, designed to operate near the Earth–Sun L2. Earlier examples include the Wilkinson Microwave Anisotropy Probe and its successor, Planck.

point
The  point lies on the line defined by the two large masses, beyond the larger of the two. Within the Sun–Earth system, the  point exists on the opposite side of the Sun, a little outside Earth's orbit and slightly closer to the center of the Sun than Earth is. This placement occurs because the Sun is also affected by Earth's gravity and so orbits around the two bodies' barycenter, which is well inside the body of the Sun. An object at Earth's distance from the Sun would have an orbital period of one year if only the Sun's gravity is considered. But an object on the opposite side of the Sun from Earth and directly in line with both "feels" Earth's gravity adding slightly to the Sun's and therefore must orbit a little farther from the barycenter of Earth and Sun in order to have the same 1-year period. It is at the  point that the combined pull of Earth and Sun causes the object to orbit with the same period as Earth, in effect orbiting an Earth+Sun mass with the Earth-Sun barycenter at one focus of its orbit.

and  points

Stability
This is the case for the Sun–Earth system, the Sun–Jupiter system, and, by a smaller margin, the Earth–Moon system. When a body at these points is perturbed, it moves away from the point, but the factor opposite of that which is increased or decreased by the perturbation (either gravity or angular momentum-induced speed) will also increase or decrease, bending the object's path into a stable, kidney bean-shaped orbit around the point (as seen in the corotating frame of reference).

Natural objects at Lagrange points

Objects that inhabit those points are generically referred to as 'trojans' or 'trojan asteroids'. The name derives from the names that were given to asteroids discovered orbiting at the Sun–Jupiter  and  points, which were taken from mythological characters appearing in Homer's Iliad, an epic poem set during the Trojan War. Asteroids at the  point, ahead of Jupiter, are named after Greek characters in the Iliad and referred to as the "Greek camp". Those at the  point are named after Trojan characters and referred to as the "Trojan camp". Both camps are considered to be types of trojan bodies.

As the Sun and Jupiter are the two most massive objects in the Solar System, there are more Sun–Jupiter trojans than for any other pair of bodies. However, smaller numbers of objects are known at the Lagrange points of other orbital systems:
 The Earth–Moon  and  points contain concentrations of interplanetary dust, known as Kordylewski clouds. Stability at these specific points is greatly complicated by solar gravitational influence.
 The Sun–Neptune  and  points contain several dozen known objects, the Neptune trojans.
 Saturn's moon Tethys has two smaller moons of Saturn in its  and  points, Telesto and Calypso. The moons wander azimuthally about the Lagrange points, with Polydeuces describing the largest deviations, moving up to 32° away from the Saturn–Dione  point.
 One version of the giant impact hypothesis postulates that an object named Theia formed at the Sun–Earth  or  point and crashed into Earth after its orbit destabilized, forming the Moon.

Objects which are on horseshoe orbits are sometimes erroneously described as trojans, but do not occupy Lagrange points. Known objects on horseshoe orbits include 3753 Cruithne with Earth, and Saturn's moons Epimetheus and Janus.

Physical and mathematical details

Lagrange points are the constant-pattern solutions of the restricted three-body problem. For example, given two massive bodies in orbits around their common barycenter, there are five positions in space where a third body, of comparatively negligible mass, could be placed so as to maintain its position relative to the two massive bodies. This occurs because the combined gravitational forces of the two massive bodies provide the exact centripetal force required to maintain the circular motion that matches their orbital motion.

Alternatively, when seen in a rotating reference frame that matches the angular velocity of the two co-orbiting bodies, at the Lagrange points the combined gravitational fields of two massive bodies balance the centrifugal pseudo-force, allowing the smaller third body to remain stationary (in this frame) with respect to the first two.

The location of L1 is the solution to the following equation, gravitation providing the centripetal force:

where r is the distance of the L1 point from the smaller object, R is the distance between the two main objects, and M1 and M2 are the masses of the large and small object, respectively. The quantity in parentheses on the right is the distance of L1 from the center of mass. The solution for r is the only real root of the following quintic function

where 
and 

We may also write this as:

Since the tidal effect of a body is proportional to its mass divided by the distance cubed, this means that the tidal effect of the smaller body at the L or at the L point is about three times of that body. We may also write:

The ratio of diameter to distance gives the angle subtended by the body, showing that viewed from these two Lagrange points, the apparent sizes of the two bodies will be similar, especially if the density of the smaller one is about thrice that of the larger, as in the case of the earth and the sun.

This distance can be described as being such that the orbital period, corresponding to a circular orbit with this distance as radius around M2 in the absence of M1, is that of M2 around M1, divided by  ≈ 1.73:

The location of L2 is the solution to the following equation, gravitation providing the centripetal force:

with parameters defined as for the L1 case. The corresponding quintic equation is

Again, if the mass of the smaller object (M2) is much smaller than the mass of the larger object (M1) then L2 is at approximately the radius of the Hill sphere, given by:

The same remarks about tidal influence and apparent size apply as for the L point. For example, the angular radius of the sun as viewed from L2 is arcsin(/) ≈ 0.264°, whereas that of the earth is arcsin(6371/) ≈ 0.242°. Looking toward the sun from L2 one sees an annular eclipse. It is necessary for a spacecraft, like Gaia, to follow a Lissajous orbit or a halo orbit around L2 in order for its solar panels to get full sun.

L3

The location of L3 is the solution to the following equation, gravitation providing the centripetal force:

with parameters M1, M2, and R defined as for the L1 and L2 cases, and r now indicates the distance of L3 from the position of the smaller object, if it were rotated 180 degrees about the larger object, while positive r implying L3 is closer to the larger object than the smaller object. If the mass of the smaller object (M2) is much smaller than the mass of the larger object (M1), then:

and 

Accordingly, the gravitational forces from the two massive bodies are in the same ratio as the masses of the two bodies, and so the resultant force acts through the barycenter of the system; additionally, the geometry of the triangle ensures that the resultant acceleration is to the distance from the barycenter in the same ratio as for the two massive bodies. The barycenter being both the center of mass and center of rotation of the three-body system, this resultant force is exactly that required to keep the smaller body at the Lagrange point in orbital equilibrium with the other two larger bodies of the system (indeed, the third body needs to have negligible mass). The general triangular configuration was discovered by Lagrange working on the three-body problem.

Radial acceleration

The radial acceleration a of an object in orbit at a point along the line passing through both bodies is given by:

where r is the distance from the large body M1, R is the distance between the two main objects, and sgn(x) is the sign function of x. The terms in this function represent respectively: force from M1; force from M2; and centripetal force. The points L3, L1, L2 occur where the acceleration is zero — see chart at right. Positive acceleration is acceleration towards the right of the chart and negative acceleration is towards the left; that is why acceleration has opposite signs on opposite sides of the gravity wells.

Stability 

A full n-body dynamical system such as the Solar System does not contain these periodic orbits, but does contain quasi-periodic (i.e. bounded but not precisely repeating) orbits following Lissajous-curve trajectories. These quasi-periodic Lissajous orbits are what most of Lagrangian-point space missions have used until now. Although they are not perfectly stable, a modest effort of station keeping keeps a spacecraft in a desired Lissajous orbit for a long time.

Similarly, a large-amplitude Lissajous orbit around  keeps a probe out of Earth's shadow and therefore ensures continuous illumination of its solar panels.

The  and  points are stable provided that the mass of the primary body (e.g. the Earth) is at least 25 times the mass of the secondary body (e.g. the Moon), and the mass of the secondary is at least 10 times that of the tertiary (e.g. the satellite). The Earth is over 81 times the mass of the Moon (the Moon is 1.23% of the mass of the Earth). The reason for the stability is a second-order effect: as a body moves away from the exact Lagrange position, Coriolis acceleration (which depends on the velocity of an orbiting object and cannot be modeled as a contour map) curves the trajectory into a path around (rather than away from) the point. Because the source of stability is the Coriolis force, the resulting orbits can be stable, but generally are not planar, but "three-dimensional": they lie on a warped surface intersecting the ecliptic plane.

Solar System values 

This table lists sample values of L1, L2, and L3 within the Solar System. Calculations assume the two bodies orbit in a perfect circle with separation equal to the semimajor axis and no other bodies are nearby. Distances are measured from the larger body's center of mass (but see barycenter especially in the case of Moon and Jupiter) with L3 showing a negative direction. The percentage columns show the distance from the orbit compared to the semimajor axis.

Spaceflight applications

Sun–Earth

Sun–Earth  is suited for making observations of the Sun–Earth system. Objects here are never shadowed by Earth or the Moon and, if observing Earth, always view the sunlit hemisphere. The first mission of this type was the 1978 International Sun Earth Explorer 3 (ISEE-3) mission used as an interplanetary early warning storm monitor for solar disturbances. Since June 2015, DSCOVR has orbited the L1 point. Conversely, it is also useful for space-based solar telescopes, because it provides an uninterrupted view of the Sun and any space weather (including the solar wind and coronal mass ejections) reaches L1 up to an hour before Earth. Solar and heliospheric missions currently located around L1 include the Solar and Heliospheric Observatory, Wind, and the Advanced Composition Explorer. Planned missions include the Interstellar Mapping and Acceleration Probe (IMAP) and the NEO Surveyor.

Sun–Earth  is a good spot for space-based observatories. Because an object around  will maintain the same relative position with respect to the Sun and Earth, shielding and calibration are much simpler. It is, however, slightly beyond the reach of Earth's umbra, so solar radiation is not completely blocked at L2. Spacecraft generally orbit around L2, avoiding partial eclipses of the Sun to maintain a constant temperature. From locations near L2, the Sun, Earth and Moon are relatively close together in the sky; this means that a large sunshade with the telescope on the dark-side can allow the telescope to cool passively to around 50 K – this is especially helpful for infrared astronomy and observations of the cosmic microwave background. The James Webb Space Telescope was positioned in a halo orbit about L2 on January 24, 2022.

Satellites at these points will wander off in a few months unless course corrections are made. 

Sun–Earth  was a popular place to put a "Counter-Earth" in pulp science fiction and comic books, despite the fact that the existence of a planetary body in this location had been understood as an impossibility once orbital mechanics and the perturbations of planets upon each other's orbits came to be understood, long before the Space Age; the influence of an Earth-sized body on other planets would not have gone undetected, nor would the fact that the foci of Earth's orbital ellipse would not have been in their expected places, due to the mass of the counter-Earth. The Sun–Earth , however, is a weak saddle point and exponentially unstable with time constant of roughly 150 years. Moreover, it could not contain a natural object, large or small, for very long because the gravitational forces of the other planets are stronger than that of Earth (for example, Venus comes within 0.3 AU of this  every 20 months).

A spacecraft orbiting near Sun–Earth  would be able to closely monitor the evolution of active sunspot regions before they rotate into a geoeffective position, so that a seven-day early warning could be issued by the NOAA Space Weather Prediction Center. Moreover, a satellite near Sun–Earth  would provide very important observations not only for Earth forecasts, but also for deep space support (Mars predictions and for crewed missions to near-Earth asteroids). In 2010, spacecraft transfer trajectories to Sun–Earth  were studied and several designs were considered.

Earth–Moon
Earth–Moon  allows comparatively easy access to Lunar and Earth orbits with minimal change in velocity and this has as an advantage to position a habitable space station intended to help transport cargo and personnel to the Moon and back. The SMART-1 Mission  passed through the L1 Lagrangian Point on 11 November 2004 and passed into the area dominated by the Moon's gravitational influence

Earth–Moon  has been used for a communications satellite covering the Moon's far side, for example, Queqiao, launched in 2018, and would be "an ideal location" for a propellant depot as part of the proposed depot-based space transportation architecture.

The L5 Society's name comes from the L4 and L5 Lagrangian points in the Earth–Moon system proposed as locations for their huge rotating space habitats. Both positions are also proposed for communication satellites covering the Moon alike communication satellites in geosynchronous orbit cover the Earth.

Sun–Venus

Scientists at the B612 Foundation were planning to use Venus's L3 point to position their planned Sentinel telescope, which aimed to look back towards Earth's orbit and compile a catalogue of near-Earth asteroids.

Sun–Mars

In 2017, the idea of positioning a magnetic dipole shield at the Sun–Mars  point for use as an artificial magnetosphere for Mars was discussed at a NASA conference. The idea is that this would protect the planet's atmosphere from the Sun's radiation and solar winds.

See also

 Co-orbital configuration
 Euler's three-body problem
 Gegenschein
 Klemperer rosette
 L5 Society
 Lagrange point colonization
 Lagrangian mechanics
 List of objects at Lagrange points
 Lunar space elevator
 Oberth effect

Explanatory notes

References

External links

 Joseph-Louis, Comte Lagrange, from Oeuvres Tome 6, "Essai sur le Problème des Trois Corps"—Essai (PDF); source Tome 6 (Viewer)
 "Essay on the Three-Body Problem" by J-L Lagrange, translated from the above, in merlyn.demon.co.uk .
 Considerationes de motu corporum coelestium—Leonhard Euler—transcription and translation at merlyn.demon.co.uk .
 What are Lagrange points?—European Space Agency page, with good animations
 Explanation of Lagrange points—Prof. Neil J. Cornish
 A NASA explanation—also attributed to Neil J. Cornish
 Explanation of Lagrange points—Prof. John Baez
 Geometry and calculations of Lagrange points—Dr J R Stockton
 Locations of Lagrange points, with approximations—Dr. David Peter Stern
 An online calculator to compute the precise positions of the 5 Lagrange points for any 2-body system—Tony Dunn
 Astronomy Cast—Ep. 76: "Lagrange Points" by Fraser Cain and Dr. Pamela Gay
 The Five Points of Lagrange by Neil deGrasse Tyson
 Earth, a lone Trojan discovered
 See the Lagrange Points and Halo Orbits subsection under the section on Geosynchronous Transfer Orbit in NASA: Basics of Space Flight, Chapter 5

Trojans (astronomy)
Point